Robert J. McCann (born 15 March 1958) is an American businessperson with Irish dual citizenship. McCann is now chairman of UBS Americas, where his duties involve strategic initiatives around clients and business priorities. He was formerly President Wealth Management Americas and President Americas of UBS Group AG. He had led the Wealth Management Americas division since 2011 and had served as a member of the UBS Group AG executive board since 2009. He relinquished both roles when he stepped down in 2015, with Tom Naratil assuming his previous roles.

Early life and education
McCann graduated from West Virginia's Bethany College in 1980 with a Bachelor's degree in economics. He was later awarded a fellowship through the Sid W. Richardson Foundation to attend the Neeley School of Business at Texas Christian University, where he earned an M.B.A. in 1982. Subsequently, at Harvard Business School, McCann attended the six-week Advanced Management Program. In 2010, McCann was awarded an honorary doctorate from Bethany College.

Career

Merrill Lynch
McCann's career at Merrill Lynch began in 1982 and spanned 26 years. From 2003 and until his departure in January 2009, McCann was Vice Chairman of Merrill Lynch and President of Global Wealth Management. During his tenure, McCann held a variety of executive leadership positions. He was the Vice-Chairman of the firm's Wealth Management Group (including Global Private Client and Merrill Lynch Investment Managers), the Head of Global Securities Research and Economics (2001 to 2003), Chief Operating Officer of Global Markets and Investment Banking (2000), and Head of Global Institutional Sales (1998 to 2000).

As Head of the Global Equity Trading & Markets Division, he was responsible for trading and risk management activities relating to Merrill's equity products, which provided issuers and investors access to world markets through the global underwriting, trading and distribution of stocks. In 1998, McCann took over the Global Institutional Client Division, where he was responsible for all debt and equity client relationships.

In 2001, McCann became a member of the Executive Management Committee and was named Head of Global Securities Research and Economics, responsible for all equity, fixed income and economic research worldwide. In addition, McCann worked in 2003 in AXA Finance as the Vice-Chairman in distribution and marketing.

UBS Group Americas

McCann is presently Chairman of UBS Americas, having stepped down as President of UBS Wealth Management Americas (formerly CEO of Wealth Management Americas) and as a member of the UBS Group AG Group Executive Board effective January 2016, roles he took on when he joined the firm in October 2009. McCann has also held the position of President Americas since December 2011 (formerly CEO of UBS Group Americas). After the restructuring of UBS AG to become UBS Group AG in 2014, he was appointed to the same position.

As President of UBS Wealth Management Americas, McCann coordinated Wealth Management Americas, the Investment Bank and the Asset Management divisions, which conduct business in the U.S., Canada, Latin America and South America.

Under McCann, Wealth Management Americas conceived Revitalizing America, an initiative that consists of high-profile speaking engagements along with programs aimed at the U.S. economy. The Clinton Foundation and UBS Wealth Management Americas formed the CEO-UBS Small Business Advisory Program, a philanthropic partnership aimed at boosting business and job growth by bolstering the knowledge and skills of small business owners in underserved communities. The Foundation's Clinton Economic Opportunity Initiative (CEO) and UBS Wealth Management Americas in 2011 concluded the six-month pilot mentorship program in the New York City metropolitan area, where small business owners received guidance from a UBS financial advisor, along with access to Wealth Management Americas clients who are experienced business leaders. In 2012 this programme was rolled out across firms in Chicago and Los Angeles.

On August 13th 2020, McCann announced his public departure from UBS

Boards and organizations
McCann has worked with various securities associations and exchanges. He is a former governor of FINRA and board member of the Securities Industry Association.

Charitable and other nonprofit pursuits

Bethany College

McCann is the founder of the McCann Learning Center at Bethany College, his alma mater. The mission of the center is to enhance the learning skills of all students, transform the college experience of students with learning disabilities and support the heightened performance of faculty and staff. McCann also established the McCann Family Student Investment Fund, which enables Bethany students to serve as investment professionals in managing and investing endowment funds. In 2015, McCann and his wife Cindy donated a challenge gift in order to fund technology upgrades, personnel, and modern processes.

The American Ireland Fund
McCann first got involved with The American Ireland Fund in 1998. Through his involvement with The American Ireland Fund, his focus has been on education and intercultural communication, where he helped raise funds to build a grade school in Northern Ireland dedicated to integrated education. He currently serves on the Executive Committee of the Board of Directors. In 2016, McCann received the Chairman's Award of the Fund.

Other nonprofit work

McCann is an Executive Patron and member of the Presidents Circle of No Greater Sacrifice, an organization that funds the education of children of military personnel who have been wounded or killed in the line of duty. He currently sits on the board of the Irish Arts Center in New York. In 2018, the National College Access Network named McCann their 2018 Champion of College Access.

Personal life
Born and raised in Pittsburgh, Pennsylvania, McCann is a dual citizen of the United States and Ireland. He was awarded the Gold Medal from the American Irish Historical Society, which is awarded to an Irish-American or Irish-national of significant accomplishment. He was inducted into the Irish America Hall of Fame in March 2015.

References

External links 
Biography on UBS website
"Tale of Two Bankers: Bob McCann, Sergio Ermotti Are Reinventing Wall Street," www.forbes.com
"Bob McCann Wins Wealth Management Madness," www.wealthmanagement.com
 
 Interview with The Washington Post (July 2014)

UBS people
American people of Irish descent
Texas Christian University alumni
Bethany College (West Virginia) alumni
1958 births
Living people